Negrevo is a village in the municipality of Pehčevo, North Macedonia. It is located close to the Bulgarian border.

Demographics
According to the 2002 census, the village had a total of 97 inhabitants. Ethnic groups in the village include:

Macedonians 97

References

Villages in Pehčevo Municipality